Peyrat-la-Nonière is a commune in the Creuse department in the Nouvelle-Aquitaine region in central France.

Geography

The river Tardes forms most of the commune's eastern border.

Population

Sights
 The church, dating from the twelfth century.
The remains of the abbey de Bonlieu.
 The castle of Chiroux.
 The two châteaux, du Mazeau and la Voreille.
 A sixteenth-century chapel.
 An ancient stone bridge over the river Tardes.

See also
Communes of the Creuse department

References

External links
Official website of Peyrat-la-Nonière 

Communes of Creuse